Peter Waite (9 May 1834 – 4 April 1922) was a South Australian pastoralist, businessman, company director and public benefactor.  Waite's philanthropic endeavors provided significant benefit to the University of Adelaide and to local public schools, and generations of students have benefited from his largesse.

Career
Waite was born at Kirkcaldy, Fife, Scotland, son of James Waite, a farmer, and his wife Elizabeth, née Stocks. Waite was left fatherless and after leaving school he was apprenticed to an ironmonger and spent nine years in commercial pursuits. Waite then sailed to Australia aboard the British Trident, landed at Melbourne and went on to South Australia. There he joined his brother James who was part owner of Pandappa station near Terowie. Waite worked on this station for some years and acquired a thorough knowledge of the pastoral industry. Waite then (in conjunction with Sir Thomas Elder) bought Paratoo station, and gradually obtained interests in other properties. He was one of the first to realize the value of fenced as against open runs, and spent over £200,000 in fencing and providing water. He later owned Momba Station, one of the largest sheep stations in outback New South Wales. Waite and other  pastoralists in the area formed the Pastoralists' Association of West Darling in 1906.

On 21 November 1864 Waite married his first cousin Matilda Methuen (d.1922), a daughter of James Methuen of Leith, Scotland. Together they had eight children.  For many years he lived in the country and kept a strict eye on the management of his various properties. Later he was able to hand over much of this management to his son, while he conducted business in Adelaide. He thoroughly understood the needs of pastoralists, and in 1883 became chairman of Elder's Wool & Produce Co. Ltd, a subsidiary Elder Smith and Company. In 1888 the two companies were amalgamated and he became chairman of directors of Elder Smith & Co. Ltd, "displaying remarkable ingenuity and initiative". He held this position for 34 years, resigning a few months before his death. Waite was also Managing Director of the Beltana Pastoral Co. Ltd and the Mutooroo Pastoral Co. Ltd.  He held directorships with the Commercial Union Assurance Co. Ltd, the British Broken Hill Co. Ltd, and the S.A. Woollen Co. Ltd.

Philanthropic deeds

Benefactions to the University of Adelaide allowed the university to establish the Waite Agricultural Research Institute which later became the Waite Campus of the university, the hub of the Waite Research Precinct. The Waite Institute was established on the site in 1924.

The donation remains one of the largest public benefactions in South Australian history. The objective of the bequest was to advance the cause of education, and more especially, to promote the teaching and study of agriculture, forestry and other related subjects. The Waite Institute has developed into an integrated research and teaching precinct that has been presented as a model for the collocation of agricultural research institutions.

Waite was working until a few months before his death from heart failure on 4 April 1922; he was survived by his wife, son and three daughters. One of his daughters, Elizabeth Macmeikan (died 5 April 1931), left the residue of her estate, some £16,000, to the University of Adelaide to be used for the study of sciences relating to the land, either in connexion with the Waite Research Institute or otherwise.

References

External links 
 Urrbrae House - University of Adelaide
 Waite Campus of the University of Adelaide
 Death of Mr. Peter Waite; A Prince of Benefactors. The Advertiser (Newspaper Adelaide, SA : 1889 - 1931), Wed 5 Apr 1922, Page 7 
 Death of Mr. Peter Waite; Big City Business Ventures. The Advertiser (Newspaper Adelaide, SA : 1889 – 1931), Wed 5 Apr 1922, Page 9
 Obituary: Death of Mr. Peter Waite; A Prince of Benefactors. - Chronicle (Newspaper Adelaide, SA : 1895 - 1954), Sat 8 Apr 1922

1834 births
1922 deaths
Australian businesspeople
Australian philanthropists
Settlers of South Australia
People from Kirkcaldy
Scottish emigrants to Australia